Norway House is a population centre of over 5,000 people, some  north of Lake Winnipeg, on the bank of the eastern channel of Nelson River, in the province of Manitoba, Canada. The population centre shares the name Norway House with the northern community of Norway House and Norway House 17, a First Nation reserve of the Norway House Cree Nation (Kinosao Sipi Cree Nation). Thus, Norway House has both a Chief and a Mayor.

Major economic activities include commercial fishing, trapping, logging, and government services. Seasonal unemployment varies, with peaks as high as 70%.

Norway House was an important establishment of the Hudson's Bay Company for most of the 19th century, serving as a major depot, and from the 1830s, as the seat of the Council of the Northern Department of Rupert's Land.

History 

After the arrival of Europeans in North America, the Hayes River became an important link in the development of Canada. The Hayes was the favoured route between York Factory and the interior of western Canada for explorers, fur traders and European settlers from 1670 to 1870, because transit was easier and food was more readily available. After Anthony Henday's explorations, Joseph Smith was sent in 1756, from York Factory, to explore the area. He ascended the Nelson River seeking Lake Winnipeg. He reached Little Playgreen Lake on September 21 that year.

In 1816, Lord Selkirk sent out a band of Norwegians, apparently ex-convicts, to build a road from York Factory to Lake Winnipeg and a series of supply posts. There are also some accounts that suggest that Norwegians were employed in 1814 and sent to nearby Playgreen Lake with a herd of reindeer to introduce reindeer herding for animal husbandry and pulling sleighs during the winter for the Hudson's Bay Company. They built Norway House at Mossy Point on the west side of the Nelson's outflow from Lake Winnipeg in 1817, replacing the former Jack River post at that location. In the last days of the rivalry between the Hudson's Bay Company and the North West Company, prior to their union in 1821, Colin Robertson, of the Hudson's Bay Company from their office in Montreal, organized a brigade of mostly French-Canadians led by John Clarke, bound for the Athabasca country to compete with the North West Company by developing the trade of supplying the colonists in addition to the company's usual business of trading furs.

In 1822, Governor Simpson passed through Norway House in the depth of winter on his way to Cumberland House. Simpson traveled through Norway House to the Columbia District in 1824-25, journeying from York Factory. He investigated a quicker route than previously used, following the Saskatchewan River and crossing the mountains at Athabasca Pass. This route, which passed through Norway House, was thereafter followed by the York Factory Express brigades.

In 1825 or 1826, much of the post was destroyed by fire. In 1826, the company abandoned its position on Mossy Point in favour of its present position on the East River, now known as the Jack River, in order to be nearer to the fishery, the food supply of its population.

In 1830, Cumberland House, formerly the most important post in the interior, was supplanted by Norway House. From the 1830s, the Councils of the Hudson's Bay Company (annual meetings of its chief factors) met at Norway House rather than York Factory. These meetings would involve planning decisions for the following year and promotions from clerk to Chief Trader and from Chief Trader to Chief Factor. Such promotions were within the authority of the Governor and Committee. The recommendations of the council would be given to Governor Simpson who would make his recommendations to London.
The last of the great Northern Council meetings that were started by Simpson a half century earlier was convened at Norway House by Donald Smith in July 1870. The men met around a great oak table with Smith as the new Governor, following his success in negotiations earlier that year concerning the Red River Rebellion on behalf of Canada, and empowered him to represent them in London concerning the rights of the Chief Factors and Chief Traders to share in the £300,000 transfer fee payable upon the surrender of Rupert's Land.

The remnants of the former Hudson’s Bay Company fort established in 1825; the company's principal inland depot for the fur trade and the site where Treaty 5 was signed in 1875 was designated a National Historic Sites of Canada in 1932. Surviving buildings include the Archway Warehouse (1839-1841), the Gaol (1855-1856) and the Powder Magazine (1837-1838).

Demographics 

Norway House 17 had a population of 5,390 in 2021 an increase of 12.1% since 2016. The community included 2,239 private dwellings on a land area of 72.99 square km.

These two adjoining communities form a population centre of 5,753.

Transportation  
Provincial Road (PR) 373, an all-weather road, leads from Norway House past PR 374 which leads to Cross Lake, through Jenpeg and then joins Provincial Trunk Highway 6.

There is a ferry that shuttles vehicles across the Nelson Channel just north of Norway House. This ferry runs most of the year, except into the winter months when an ice bridge is opened. The ferry is known to get stuck occasionally in the freeze-up season and cause delays.

The most important means of transportation in this remote territory is the airplane. Manitoba Northern Airports maintains Norway House Airport with a  crushed-rock airstrip. There are daily flights to Winnipeg on two private airlines: Perimeter Air and NAC Air.

Services
Norway House has several restaurants, two hotels, a Royal Bank branch, two Northern stores, two Tim Horton locations and a KFC fast food restaurant, a full service post office, two video stores and paved roads within the community.

Norway House is served by the Royal Canadian Mounted Police and the NHCN Safety Officers.

Education 
The Helen Betty Osborne Ininiw Education Resource Centre is a kindergarten to Grade 12 school with preschool program as well. It was preceded by the Rossville Residential school. It is one of the most technologically-advanced schools in the province and one of the biggest schools of the Frontier School Division.

Norway House is home to a regional centre of the University College of the North and has satellite degree programming from Brandon University's Faculty of Education and the University of Manitoba.

Climate
Norway House has a subarctic climate (Dfc) bordering a warm summer continental climate (Dfb). As is typical in Manitoba, precipitation patterns are dominant in summers, with winters being cold and dry. Norway House has the coldest recorded temperature in Manitoba.

Treaty and York Boat Days 
The Treaty and York Boat Days are annually each summer from the beginning of August for a week; the York Boat events serve as the main attraction. These are team boat races with participants aged 8–18. This event is to honor the traditions of the ancestors who once used York Boats as a means of transportation. Treaty and York Boat Days has a variety of hosts each year who set up food booths for the community to come together, often these booths prepare meals that are homemade.

See also 

 York Factory Express
 Voyageurs
 North American fur trade
 Norwegian Canadians

References

External links
 Norway House Community Council
 Norway House Cree Nation
 Stats Canada, 2006 Census, Norway House Reserve 17
 Manitoba Aboriginal and Northern Affairs, Community Profile, Norway House

Designated places in Manitoba
Hudson's Bay Company trading posts
Northern communities in Manitoba
Norwegian Canadian settlements
Settlements in Manitoba
Unincorporated communities in Northern Region, Manitoba